Bharali is a surname from Assam, India. Notable people with the name include:

Bhabendra Nath Bharali, Indian politician
Devananda Bharali (1883–1972), Indian linguist, writer, translator and dramatist
Hema Bharali, Indian freedom activist and social worker
Uddhab Bharali (born 1962), Indian innovator

Assamese-language surnames